Calvin Lee Anderson (born March 25, 1996) is an American football offensive tackle for the New England Patriots of the National Football League (NFL). He played college football at Rice and as a graduate transfer one season at Texas.

High school career 
Anderson attended Georgetown High School for the first three seasons of his high school career, before transferring to Westlake High School for his senior season. A undersized lineman for most of his high school career, he committed to Rice as a junior and remained committed to them despite offers from Power 5 schools Texas Tech and Kansas State.

College career 
After redshirting his freshman year, Anderson was a three-year starter at Rice where he started in 36 consecutive games for the Owls. He also garnered Conference USA All-Conference Honorable Mentions in 2016 and 2017. After narrowing his graduate transfer choices down to Michigan, Texas, Oklahoma, and Auburn, Anderson announced that he would transfer to Texas for the 2018 season.

Professional career 

After going undrafted in the 2019 NFL Draft, Anderson signed with the New England Patriots. He was waived by the Patriots on May 13, 2019, and claimed by the New York Jets. He was waived by the Jets at the end of the preseason and added to the Jets practice squad.

Denver Broncos 
Anderson was signed by the Denver Broncos from the New York Jets' practice squad on October 1, 2019.

The Broncos placed an exclusive-rights free agent tender on Anderson on March 16, 2021. He signed the one-year contract on May 17. He entered the 2021 season as the primary swing tackle for the Broncos. He started three games in the middle of the season. 

On March 14, 2022, Anderson signed a one-year contract extension with the Broncos.
Anderson started 9 games in 2022 season for the Denver Broncos. Primarily as a left tackle. Anderson also started all pre-season games.

New England Patriots 
On March 16, 2023, Anderson signed a two-year contract with the New England Patriots.

Personal life 
Born in Philadelphia and raised in Austin, Texas, Anderson's father played college football at Army and was a military flight surgeon who also obtained a Master of Business Administration, became an ordained minister, and served as a physician before retiring as a full-bird colonel in 2019. Anderson has gained notoriety for having the ability to solve a Rubik's Cube different ways, such as behind his back or blindfolded. He was also named a brand ambassador for Rubik's Cube in 2019, representing the company at international events in the offseason. A mathematical economic analysis major at Rice, Anderson once made a PowerPoint presentation to his parents to get them to invest in Nintendo. .During off season in 2022 Anderson enrolled in a program at Harvard Business School. 

Anderson is in a long term relationship dating model, lawyer and real estate investor Sherée Olaiya Lanihun from Amsterdam.Sherée obtained a Bachelor of Laws a Master of Laws and a Master of Business. Sherée is a Cambridge University Alumni

References

External links 
 Denver Broncos bio
 Texas Longhorns bio
 Rice Owls bio

1996 births
Living people
Players of American football from Philadelphia
Players of American football from Austin, Texas
American football offensive tackles
Rice Owls football players
Texas Longhorns football players
New England Patriots players
New York Jets players
Denver Broncos players